Lord Melville may refer to:
 Earl of Melville, a title in the Peerage of Scotland
 Viscount Melville, a title in the Peerage of the United Kingdom
 , a schooner of the British Royal Navy
 , one of several ships of that name